Richmond Parish was created as a civil parish in Prince County, Prince Edward Island, Canada, during the 1764–1766 survey of Samuel Holland.

It contains the following townships:

 Lot 13
 Lot 14
 Lot 15
 Lot 16
 Lot 17

Parishes of Prince Edward Island
Geography of Prince County, Prince Edward Island